Ermera (Vila Ermera) is a city in East Timor and a former capital of the East Timorese community, Ermera. Ermera in Mambai means "red water." It has a population of 8,907. Ermera's center lies in the Suco of Poetete (Ermera Subdistrict, Ermera District).

References

Populated places in East Timor
Ermera Municipality